Tanis is a mystery horror fiction podcast executive produced by Terry Miles who also voices the podcast's narrator, Nic Silver. In the show, Silver undertakes a search to discover what and where the mysterious entity Tanis is. While the style of Tanis evokes the earlier investigative nonfiction podcast Serial and its plot commingles real-world historical events and places with fictional elements, Taniss production team never acknowledges the story's fictional nature.

After its premiere on October 13, 2015, episodes of Tanis were released every two weeks during the first four seasons and weekly during the fifth. Critical reception of the show has been positive and it peaked on the U.S. iTunes podcast download chart in the eleventh spot. A television adaptation of the podcast is planned as of 2017 and the fifth season of the podcast premiered on September 2, 2020.

Content

Synopsis
Nic Silver, a former radio host, discovers references to something called Tanis in two disparate sources. He begins hosting the podcast in an effort to determine what and where Tanis may be, quickly enlisting the help of an "information specialist" known via the username Meerkatnip. Silver comes to believe that Tanis is currently somewhere in the Puget Sound area. His search, aided with information provided by Meerkatnip, leads him to confront a variety of mysterious groups and organizations: Tesla Nova Corporation, a group Silver calls "The Cult of Tanis", and a group known as the Grackles.

Format
Tanis is a mystery horror podcast released every two weeks on iTunes and other services. Terry Miles, with the production company Public Radio Alliance, serves as the show's executive producer and provides the voice work for Silver, who Miles refers to as his "cousin" and who is listed as the show's other executive producer. Episodes of the show take approximately one week to plot and write, another week to record, and two weeks to mix, edit, and score. Dialogue is recorded where it occurs in the narrative, such that a scene which takes place in Tanis in a living room would be recorded in an actual living room. Tanis is scored with backing music and features a musical intro song by Miles's former band, Ashley Park. Financial support for the podcast comes from listeners via Patreon and sponsors, for whose products and services ads are integrated into the production.

The podcast was described as "deep fiction" by The Guardian because, while it blends real-world and fictional events and people into its narrative, the show's creators and characters never acknowledge that the podcast is fictitious. The podcast, according to Molly Osberg in Vice, occurs in a world that "isn't so much an alternate reality as [a world] that hovers comfortably adjacent to ours." In addition to the regular episodes, Miles also produces a variety of supporting documents and interviews which he posts on the show's official website in order to lend plausibility to the notion that the events of the show may be real. Tanis mimics the successful format of the earlier nonfictional investigative podcast Serial, notably its "unpretentious narrative style and mystery 'plot'". It is one of a spate of podcasts released in the wake of Serial first season in 2014 that remixed those elements of Serial with the horror and mystery genres, other such podcasts including Alice Isn't Dead, ars Paradoxica, and Tanis sister show The Black Tapes.

Themes
Themes of powerlessness and uneasy alliance with a (possible) enemy are present in Taniss narrative. Michael J. Collins described a pattern in mystery horror podcasts of narrators existing within uncertain personal or professional situations, such as Silver's inconsistent work and sleep schedules, which mimic "the lifestyles of overworked, yet unremunerated, Millennials." Collins wrote that Tanis evoked millennial economic unease when Silver accepts aid in his investigation from Tesla Nova Corporation and thus becomes complicit with the organization Silver believes may be responsible for the goings-on he is investigating.

Episodes
The first season of Tanis premiered October 13, 2015, when the first two episodes were released. The third episode was released on October 19 and subsequent episodes have generally been released every two weeks, although episodes were released weekly in season five. The second season premiered April 20, 2016, and season three premiered February 21, 2017. The fourth season premiered February 28, 2018, with the fifth premiering September 2, 2020.

Season 1
{| class="wikitable plainrowheaders" style="background: #FFFFFF;" style="width:100%"
! scope="col" style="background:#333; color:#fff; width:5%;"|Episode
! scope="col" style="background:#333; color:#fff; width:22%;"|Title
! scope="col" style="background:#333; color:#fff; width:14%;"|Release date
! scope="col" style="background:#333; color:#fff; width:9%;"|Production code
|-

|}

Season 2
{| class="wikitable plainrowheaders" style="background: #FFFFFF;" style="width:100%"
! scope="col" style="background-color:#804060;color:white; width:5%;"|Episode
! scope="col" style="background-color:#804060;color:white; width:22%;"|Title
! scope="col" style="background-color:#804060;color:white; width:14%;"|Release date
! scope="col" style="background-color:#804060;color:white; width:9%;"|Production code
|-

|}

Season 3
{| class="wikitable plainrowheaders" style="background: #FFFFFF;" style="width:100%"
! scope="col" style="background-color:#6C541E;color:white; width:5%;"|Episode
! scope="col" style="background-color:#6C541E;color:white; width:22%;"|Title
! scope="col" style="background-color:#6C541E;color:white; width:14%;"|Release date
! scope="col" style="background-color:#6C541E;color:white; width:9%;"|Production code
|-

|}

Season 4
{| class="wikitable plainrowheaders" style="background: #FFFFFF;" style="width:100%"
! scope="col" style="background-color:#A3C1AD;color:black; width:5%;"|Episode
! scope="col" style="background-color:#A3C1AD;color:black; width:22%;"|Title
! scope="col" style="background-color:#A3C1AD;color:black; width:14%;"|Release date
! scope="col" style="background-color:#A3C1AD;color:black; width:9%;"|Production code
|-

|}

Season 5
{| class="wikitable plainrowheaders" style="background: #FFFFFF;" style="width:100%"
! scope="col" style="background-color:#5F87BE;color:black; width:5%;"|Episode
! scope="col" style="background-color:#5F87BE;color:black; width:22%;"|Title
! scope="col" style="background-color:#5F87BE;color:black; width:14%;"|Release date
! scope="col" style="background-color:#5F87BE;color:black; width:9%;"|Production code
|-

|}

Reception
Tanis has received critical acclaim. Melissa Locker, writing in The Guardian described the podcast, as well as sister show The Black Tapes, as "compelling and wildly addictive." The scholars Danielle Hancock and Leslie McMurtry described the podcast as "elegantly  the new Gothic horror podcast paradigm" on account of its production value, attentiveness to the possibilities of the podcast format, and in-universe connections with traditional elements of Gothic fiction. In Bustle, Lucia Peters praised the melding of real-world and fictional elements in Taniss narrative, calling the podcast "a fascinating, if somewhat confusing, ride." Tanis peaked on the U.S. iTunes podcast download chart at number 11.

Television adaptation
In 2017, Universal Cable Productions and Dark Horse Entertainment announced a deal to adapt Tanis for television, led by Miles and television writer Lee Shipman. Sam Raimi and Debbie Liebling will serve as the show's producers.

References

Further reading

External links
 

2015 podcast debuts
Audio podcasts
Horror podcasts
Washington (state) in fiction
American podcasts
Scripted podcasts